The Liverpool, Southport and Preston Junction Railway was formed in 1884, and totaled 7 miles.

It connected the West Lancashire Railway's lines to the north of Southport to the CLC Southport & Cheshire Lines Extension Railway at Altcar and Hillhouse railway station. Known also as the Barton branch, it ran from 1 September 1887 to 21 January 1952. The Barton branch was notable for the "Altcar Bob" service, introduced in July 1906.

The short section of line that contains  is still open and has replaced a section of the original Manchester and Southport Railway. This northern part was electrified in 1904 and then de-electrified sixty years later.

References 
 Cotterall, J.E., (1982), The West Lancashire Railway, The Oakwood Press, 
 Nock, O.S. (1969), The Lancashire and Yorkshire Railway - A Concise History, Ian Allan,

External links 
 On The Track of Altcar Bob

Historic transport in Merseyside
Historic transport in Lancashire
Pre-grouping British railway companies
Lancashire and Yorkshire Railway
Closed railway lines in North West England
Railway companies established in 1884
Railway companies disestablished in 1897
British companies disestablished in 1897
British companies established in 1884